William Theed  (1764–1817), called William Theed the elder, was an English sculptor and painter, the father of William Theed the younger, who was also a sculptor.

Life

He was born on 3 August 1764 the son of William Theed, a wig-maker in Wych Street in London and his wife Sarah Palmer.

He was trained at the Royal Academy Schools in 1786 and began a career in oil painting: both portraits and classical subjects. After a tour with other artists of Italy beginning in 1791 (where he spent 4 or 5 years in Rome and reportedly got married) he returned to England around 1796. He worked as a modeller for Wedgwood from 1799 to 1804, and then for the gold and silversmiths Rundell and Bridge back in London from 1804 to 1817. He was elected an associate of the Royal Academy in 1811 and as Royal Academician in 1813. He trained his son in the early stages of the latter's career.

Known Works

Memorial ceramic to Thomas Byerley commissioned by Wedgewood (1811)
Bacchanalian Group in bronze (1813) stolen from Burlington House
Hercules capturing the Thracian Horses on the pediment of the Royal Mews
The Prodigal Son for Lord Yarborough later moved to the Ussher Art Gallery in Lincoln, England
Thetis returning from Vulcan (1812) Royal Collection
Monument to Thomas Westfaling (1814) in Ross-on-Wye parish church

Family

He married Frances Rougeot (d.1818) and had one child.

References

External links

Theed, William I, in: A Biographical Dictionary of Sculptors in Britain, 1660–1851, Henry Moore Foundation

1764 births
1817 deaths
Royal Academicians
English sculptors
English male sculptors